Elvira of Castile ( – 6 February 1135) was a member of the House of Jiménez and the first Queen of Sicily as the wife of Roger II of Sicily.

Elvira was a legitimate daughter of Alfonso VI, king of León and Castile. Her mother was King Alfonso VI's fourth wife, Isabella. This Isabella is likely identical to Zaida of Seville, the Muslim princess who was Alfonso's mistress before marrying him. Growing up at her father's court in the multiconfessional city of Toledo, Elvira must have been accustomed to a significant level of convivencia, which was present in Sicily as well.

In 1117 or 1118, Elvira married Roger II, then count of Sicily and king from 1130. Sicily too had a sizeable Muslim population, and the marriage was part of Roger's plan to emulate the religious policy of Elvira's father. Elvira's likely descent from the Muslim rulers of Al-Andalus exemplifies a "pattern of cultural association" between the queens of Sicily and the Islamic world. She may have even influenced the extensive cultivation of Islamic art during her husband's reign.

There is exceptionally little information about Queen Elvira. She does not appear to have been active in politics or as a church patron, and is chiefly remembered for giving birth to Roger's six children. In addition to a daughter who died young, Elvira and Roger had five sons:

Roger (1118 – 12 May 1148), duke of Apulia (from 1135), possibly also count of Lecce
Tancred (1119–1138), prince of Bari (from 1135)
Alfonso (1120/1121 – 10 October 1144), prince of Capua (from 1135) and duke of Naples
William (b. 1131 – d. 7 May 1166), duke of Apulia (from 1148)
 Henry (born in 1135, died young)

In 1135, both Roger and Elvira fell ill. The illness was grave and infectious. The king survived, but the queen died on 6 February. Roger was devastated by her death; he withdrew to his room and refused to see anyone except his closest servants. Eventually rumors spread that he too had died. Roger remained a widower for fourteen years and remarried only in 1149, as he had outlived four out of five sons he had had with Elvira.

Notes

References 

1100s births
1135 deaths
Roger II of Sicily
Royal consorts of Sicily
12th-century Italian women
12th-century Italian nobility
Leonese infantas
Castilian infantas
Elvira
Infectious disease deaths in Sicily
Deaths in childbirth
Daughters of emperors
Duchesses of Apulia
Daughters of kings